Dead Eye is the fourth novel by Mark Greaney, published in 2013 by Berkley Books. It is also the fourth book in the Gray Man series. In the novel, Court Gentry must outwit his former fellow student from a secret assassination program in the past, who has essentially the same skills as him  and has been directed to terminate him.

Plot summary 

Court Gentry goes to the town of Ushkovo in Russia to assassinate Gregor Sidorenko, a Russian crime boss and his former handler who wants him killed after a double cross from an operation in Sudan. Unbeknownst to Gentry, an American private contractor agency, Townsend Government Services, has been tracking him across Europe for a while and has found him while surveilling Sidorenko's house at the time of his assassination. After Gentry kills Sidorenko, Townsend House head Leland Babbitt brings in highly skilled assassin Russell "Russ" Whitlock, code-named Dead Eye, to track Gentry down and kill him.

Russ, who operates alone, tracks down Gentry to a hotel in Tallinn, Estonia and informs the Townsend House. An eight-man strike team was then dispatched to kill Gentry, but in a fit of irony, Russ, posing as a bounty hunter coming to help him, warns Gentry of the operation to kill him. They escape the hotel and fight off the pursuing strike team, killing seven of them (the other one was later hospitalized and arrested, others were killed by Russ alone in order to silence them). Russ was wounded in the crossfire, and Court later treats his wound.

Russ reveals the truth partially to Court in order to assuage his suspicions. It has been told that he was also in the Autonomous Asset Development Program, which was a secret assassination training program from years ago, as Gentry did. Later, Russ offers to help Gentry in his work as an assassin, which Gentry initially refuses. They later part ways, with Russ giving Gentry his contact number and later Court going to Stockholm, Sweden to lay low for a while.

Back in the United States, the Central Intelligence Agency (CIA), Gentry's former agency, has been wanting him dead since they betrayed him. Director of the CIA's National Clandestine Service Denny Carmichael visits the Townsend House and berates Babbitt for the failed operation in Tallinn. He urges him to exhaust more resources to track down the Gray Man in Europe and kill him, further hinting that a country that has good relations with the U.S. wants him dead in order to safeguard their relations.

Meanwhile, Russ goes to an Iranian intelligence outpost in Beirut, Lebanon and uses Court's identity as the Gray Man, hoping to score a contract job from the Quds Force, Iran's special forces unit, to assassinate the prime minister of Israel Ehud Kalb, who was seen as a threat to their country over oil interests, in the process setting up Court as the fall guy. The Iranian intelligence officer present, Ali Hussein, was initially skeptical of his willingness to do such an operation, but Russ makes them propose a counteroffer to him: assassinate any public figure who is seen to Iran as a problem. Hussein accepts his suggestion, and gives him his first target: Amir Zarini, a filmmaker whose films have insulted the Iranian government by blaspheming Islam.

An Israeli intelligence asset has discovered an assassination plot to their prime minister set in motion by Iranian intelligence, and their plan to hire Russ as the assassin (they report it as the Gray Man). This prompts Mossad intelligence agent Ruth Ettinger to be called in by the CIA and later, the Townsend House for the three agencies to coordinate in tracking down Gentry before he is supposed to kill the Israeli PM. An intrepid operative, Ettinger surmises that it is not Gentry's style to undertake a hit on a head of state, which was dismissed by the Townsend House as over the motive of money. Later, a sighting of Gentry in Stockholm prompts Ruth to go there with her team of Mossad intelligence agents to coordinate with Townsend House's drone team already stationed there.

The next day, the Townsend House drone spots Gentry on the streets, prompting Ruth and her colleagues to follow him. They identify the house where he's been staying, but Ruth decides to minimize their surveillance in order to be certain of his intentions. Later that early morning, another strike team has been dispatched by Townsend House to Stockholm to find and kill Gentry in his supposed hideaway. Still embittered by her Mossad op gone awry in Rome the previous year, Ruth opposes the immediate action, implying on the collateral damage likely to be inflicted, but the strike team and their boss Babbitt dismiss her. She later finds Gentry leaving his hideaway, and decides to tail him. She later halted her surveillance and decides not to tell her colleagues and the Townsend House operatives about what happened.

Meanwhile, in Nice, France, Russ goes forward with his assassination of filmmaker Amir Zarini while he was in a convoy, aiming to make it look like a Gray Man op. He later fails to make this so when he shoots the driver of the car carrying Zarini. It crashes into another car, seemingly killing everyone inside, and he was forced to kill the filmmaker's surviving bodyguards and later, some police officers who converged on the scene. He hastily escapes and calls Hussein, who tells him that they are still not convinced that he is the Gray Man, but gives him one more task: to describe the details of a massacre that happened in an airport in Kiev, Ukraine years ago, which later became an urban legend and was thought by many to be Gentry's work because of the perfect execution of the killings but was not proven. Russ, who knew about the Kiev op but didn't know the specifics, becomes angry and hangs up. He decides to go to Stockholm and pressure Gentry into telling him what happened in Kiev.

Meanwhile, in Stockholm, the strike team raids Gentry's hideaway, finding it empty; they deduce that he escaped. Ruth and her team of agents decide to continue their surveillance of Gentry on their own. They later spot Gentry again, and Ruth decides to go try to meet him in a bar that night. While Ruth engages Gentry to a conversation over drinks, Gentry calls Russ to check up on the Townsend House's hunt for him. In an exchange of information which provides that Court will tell him about the Kiev op, Russ warns him that he is also being hunted by the Mossad, and that the girl who has been talking to him in the bar is one of them. Alarmed, he hangs up and then holds Ruth at gunpoint. She reveals the reason why the Mossad are hunting for him, in which Gentry was previously oblivious. He later leaves the bar, telling her not to follow him.

Gentry later goes away from Stockholm to lay low once more, and then calls Russ to talk about the Kiev op, which he confirms that he is the sole assassin. Three years ago, an embittered Russian general had told a Ukrainian mobster that Russians were trying to sell their nuclear secrets to the Iranians for their nuclear enrichment program. The mobster hired Gentry to stop the exchange. Gentry executed the otherwise impossible operation successfully and with skill, which explains why it became an urban legend among the intelligence community. In turn, Russ repeats what happened to Hussein, and his deal was accepted.

Russ then goes to Stockholm to meet up with the Townsend House's strike team and the drone operators stationed there. The strike team leader told him that the last surviving member of the strike team at Tallinn had now talked, and that his story contradicts Russ's account of what happened. This was interrupted when Gentry was spotted by a drone in a train station. The strike team is immediately dispatched there, and Babbitt tells Russ to stand down from the hunt because of his conflicting account of what happened in Tallinn. Still, Russ goes to the train station against orders.

Ruth and her team agents were also alerted to the presence of the strike team in the train station and decide to go there. Russ finds out about this and later kills one of them by his garrote. He then alerts Gentry to the ongoing hunt against him, and later escapes. Ruth later finds his colleague's body and falsely blames Gentry for his death, then later spots Gentry and follows him into a train bound for Hamburg.

While in the train Russ calls Gentry and reveals that he killed a Mossad operative back in the train station, and later Gentry figures out about Russ's operation to assassinate the Israeli Prime Minister and the events connected to it, as well as discovering that the CIA had hired him for his supposed mental instability. He angrily hangs up the phone and later finds Ruth again in the train. Ruth has been embittered by the death of her colleague and later calls her boss, Yanis Alvey, to tell him everything, and he orders her to stand down from the operation, but she presses on. Gentry tells her everything about the assassination plot, and she believes him. Ruth in turn retells what Court said to her boss, but the Mossad executives don't believe her. Gentry and Ruth later work together to thwart the plot.

Russ goes to London for the assassination of the Israeli PM, who is scheduled to arrive in two days for a conference there. Babbitt calls and  tells him that Mossad is currently surveilling Gentry on a train. Angry again at Gentry for him complicating his operation, Russ decides to rush the assassination job by going to Brussels, Belgium, where the Israeli PM is going for the next day to pay his respects at a cemetery. Upon arriving there, he finds out that his passport has been flagged by Babbitt, who is shocked to know through Mossad that he plans on killing the prime minister. However, this was later revoked by Carmichael, and everything came back to business. Carmichael later tells Babbitt that they intend to use the prime minister as bait for Dead Eye to kill Gentry, in order to prevent blame from going to the CIA.

Meanwhile, Gentry and Ruth try to find a boat to take them to Copenhagen on their way to Brussels, but they were spotted by the Townsend strike team and their drone. They later evade them and are able to escape by stealing a private jet in a nearby aircraft parking lot and going to Hamburg. The strike team also goes there by helicopter.

Ruth's boss Alvey goes to Hamburg with a band of Metsada (Mossad's special operations division) operatives in order to bring back Ruth. The Mossad doesn't want her to become collateral damage when the Townsend strike team finds her with Gentry. Unbeknownst to them, Gentry and Ruth had already parted ways; Ruth had gone to Brussels while Gentry would buy a weapon from an arms dealer in Hamburg whom he used to know.

Gentry finds the arms dealer in his house and tries to buy a weapon from him, but he tells him that he has not been selling weapons for a while. Meanwhile, the Townsend strike force has spotted Gentry in the neighborhood where the arms dealer lives, converges there and sends two of them into the area, spooking the arms dealer. Alvey sees them and decides to go there alone. Gentry escapes and later kills the strike team members. Alvey and Gentry later see each other, and Gentry accidentally shoots Alvey, wounding him. Finding out that he is from Mossad, Gentry berates him for not believing Ruth, and flees the scene.

The next day, Babbitt and his second-in-command Jeff Parks arrive in Brussels to try to bring Dead Eye in. They spot Ruth and offers her a deal: the exchange of Gentry for Dead Eye, and the assassination plot will be thwarted. Ruth conveys this to Gentry, who has just arrived from Hamburg, and they perceive this as a trap. They devise a plan to outwit the Townsend House operatives with Gentry following their drone to its station and Ruth leading Babbitt away from Gentry.

Babbitt and Parks, as well as the strike force, find Russ and abduct him. They tell him of their plan, but Russ, secretly preparing to escape, knows that it is a trap to Gentry and Ruth's thinking, and suggests that they kidnap Ruth in order to lure Court in. They agree and Ruth is later taken in by the strike team. Gentry, meanwhile, has found the drone station and holds the drone operators at gunpoint, telling them that they look for Dead Eye through their drone.

The drone closes in on the safehouse where Dead Eye, Ruth, Babbitt, Parks and the strike team had gathered. Gentry calls Babbitt, finds out about the kidnappings and wants to rescue Ruth. Suddenly, having cut off his restraints, Russ immediately kills some of the strike team and then Ruth, then holds Babbitt at gunpoint in order for him to escape and continue with his assassination job. Babbitt, Parks and the surviving members of the strike team try to follow him and stop the plot.

Having watched Ruth being killed by Russ through the drone, Gentry seeks revenge and heads for the safehouse. He intercepts the convoy carrying Babbitt, Parks and the strike team and kills some of them, then takes off in search of Russ. Babbitt flees the scene.

Russ has arrived at his sniper's nest within distance of the cemetery where the prime minister is due to arrive, and readies for his job. Gentry, meanwhile, has discovered his sniper's nest, much to Russ's anger. He later surprises Gentry and tries to strangle him with his garrote but Gentry, having been wounded in the earlier shootout, surprisingly dodges it. The Gray Man and Dead Eye fall into a frozen pond and then fight for their own lives. Dead Eye eventually gains the upper hand by emerging from the frozen water and crawling slowly in the ice above the frozen pond to his weapon, a Glock 17. Gentry has apparently drowned in the coldness of the water, but then surprises Russ by breaking the ice above his weapon. He picks up the gun and shoots Russ dead.

The next day, having recovered from his wounds, Court arrives at Amsterdam. There, he receives a call from the recuperating Alvey, thanking him for his efforts in thwarting the assassination plot against the Israeli prime minister. Alvey then offers Gentry a chance to make it back to the US. Weeks later, Gentry is in Washington, D.C., for the first time since the CIA put a shoot-on-sight order on him years ago, now tailing Babbitt, who by now is trying to make amends with Carmichael after the failed operation.

Development 

As in his previous novels, Greaney did a lot of extensive research for Dead Eye. He went to Belgium, Denmark, Estonia, Germany, and, Sweden, countries which are used as settings for the novel.

Co-authoring with Tom Clancy, which started with Locked On and continued through Clancy's death in 2013, allowed him access to military officers and CIA personnel. According to Greaney, this access was "100 percent because of the Tom Clancy books. I've met with 'spooks,' and I've met with paramilitary ... I met a lot of people who brag about how they never read books … novels. But when they hear the name Tom Clancy, they want to help. They're fascinated that someone like me is interested in a specific aspect of what they do. They're not passing classified information to me, obviously, but my meeting with them is a one-stop place for me to get good, open-source material. It's become the most interesting part of the entire writing process for me ... the people I've met in the past three years, working with Tom Clancy."

References 

The Gray Man
2013 American novels
Berkley Books books
American thriller novels